Burabay can refer to:

Burabay, Burabay District, Kazakhstan  
Burabay District, a district in Akmola Region, Kazakhstan
Lake Burabay, a lake of the Kokshetau Lakes
Burabay National Park, a protected area in the Kokshetau Mountains, Kazakh Uplands
Burabay Ski Jumps, a ski jumping complex in Shchuchinsk, Kazakhstan